Albert Benjamin Chandler III (born September 12, 1959) is an American lawyer and politician who served as the United States representative for  from 2004 to 2013. A Democrat, Chandler was first elected to Congress in a 2004 special election. He served until January 2013, having been defeated for re-election by Andy Barr in the 2012 elections.

Early life, education and career
Chandler was born in Versailles, Kentucky on September 12, 1959, the son of Lucie "Toss" (née Dunlap) and A. B. Ben Chandler Jr. His paternal grandfather, A. B. Happy Chandler., served as Governor of Kentucky, Commissioner of Baseball, and as a U.S. Senator.

Chandler graduated with distinction from the University of Kentucky with a BA in History and a J.D. from the University of Kentucky College of Law. Chandler became a private practice lawyer in Lexington, KY before starting his political career.

Early political career
Chandler started his political career as State Auditor (per the Constitution of the Commonwealth, officially called the "Auditor of Public Accounts") from 1991 to 1995. In 1995, Chandler won the Attorney General of Kentucky race by a 20-point margin, making him the youngest sitting attorney general in the nation at the time. In 1999, Chandler was reelected to a second term as attorney general with no political opposition.

As attorney general, Chandler championed Kentucky's "No Call" list and collected thousands of dollars in fines to the state for companies that did not comply with the new law.  Chandler also strengthened federal laws regarding the "No Call" registry.

Also during his time as attorney general, Chandler recovered $45 million from one of Kentucky's largest insurance companies when it illegally moved funds out of state. This $45 million now funds the Foundation for a Healthy Kentucky.

U.S. House of Representatives

Chandler represented the Sixth Congressional District of Kentucky in the United States House of Representatives since a special election in 2004 until 2013. Although Chandler is a Democrat, the Sixth Congressional District strongly leans Republican, rated by Charlie Cook in his Cook Partisan Voting Index as "R + 7," meaning a generic Republican running against a generic Democrat would win by 7 points more than he would nationally.

He is a moderate to conservative Democrat and in its 2010 vote rankings, National Journal rated Chandler as being the ideological center of the House of Representatives.  Although Chandler is a Democrat and has supported many Democratic bills including supporting healthcare for children through the SCHIP law and the Recovery Act, he has also voted against some large pieces of Democratic-led legislation including the Wall Street Bailout and the Affordable Care Act.

Chandler was a member of the Blue Dog Coalition, a fiscally conservative Democratic caucus. This caucus is generally composed of Democrats serving Republican leaning congressional districts. He served as the chair of the national Blue Dog Task Force on Oversight and Regulatory Review.  According to the website, this taskforce "The Task Force on Oversight and Regulatory Review is responsible for taking a look at the nearly 8,000 regulations issued annually by the federal government and for analyzing these new rules to ensure Congressional intent is appropriately followed. Under the leadership of Chair Ben Chandler (KY-06) and Vice-Chair Tim Holden (PA-17), the Task Force monitors implementation efforts, identifies overly burdensome regulations and seeks to modify rules problematic to job creation."

Chandler has voted in favor of the American Recovery and Reinvestment Act of 2009, the American Clean Energy and Security Act of 2009,  against the Dodd–Frank Wall Street Reform and Consumer Protection Act and the Troubled Asset Relief Program, against the Patient Protection and Affordable Care Act, against Cut, Cap and Balance Act and for funding the State Children's Health Insurance Program.

In 2010 Chandler was criticized for accepting campaign contributions from embattled Congressman Rep. Charles Rangel's National Leadership PAC.

In September 2010, Kentucky.com reported that Chandler was one of several "moderate Democrats facing tough re-election bids who are bucking the Obama administration and pushing to extend tax cuts at every income level."

In 2011, Chandler voted for the National Defense Authorization Act for Fiscal Year 2012 as part of a controversial provision that allows the government and the military to indefinitely detain American citizens and others without trial.

Taxes
Chandler is a signer of Americans for Tax Reform's Taxpayer Protection Pledge.

Committee assignments
Before being appointed to the Intelligence Committee, Chandler served on the Appropriations Committee. 
Committee on Foreign Affairs
Subcommittee on the Middle East and South Asia
Permanent Select Committee on Intelligence
Subcommittee on Technical and Tactical Intelligence

Caucus memberships
A full list of Chandler's caucus memberships can be found here: https://web.archive.org/web/20120116233212/http://chandler.house.gov/legis/caucus-membership.shtml
Healthy Forests Caucus
Horse Caucus (Co-chair)
International Conservation Caucus (Co-chair)
Public Broadcasting Caucus (Co-chair)
Wildlife Refuge Caucus

Chandler was a Blue Dog Democrat as well as a member of the House New Democrat Coalition. His name had been rumored as a candidate for governor for the 2007 election and Senator in the 2008 election. Chandler, however, announced on November 30, 2006, that he would not seek the governorship in 2007, stating he could better serve the Commonwealth in Congress: "With rising seniority and a Democratic majority, I have the opportunity to do so much more for my constituents and for the people of Kentucky." Chandler told "Kentucky Newsmakers" that he would not start holding so-called town hall meetings in 2009, citing a lack of "civility" at forums regarding health care. Chandler ultimately voted against the Patient Protection and Affordable Care Act.

Political campaigns
Chandler was the Democratic candidate for governor in the election of 2003. He was defeated in that election by his Republican opponent, Congressman Ernie Fletcher. Fletcher resigned from Congress in order to become governor, and a special election was held for his seat in February 2004. Chandler became the Democratic candidate and won the election, defeating state Senator Alice Forgy Kerr by a 55%-to-43% margin.

As a superdelegate in the 2008 United States presidential election, Chandler endorsed Barack Obama. Chandler's 2008 Republican opponent in the race for Congress was attorney Jon Larson.

2010

Chandler was challenged by Republican nominee Andy Barr in the November 2010 election. Chandler was elected by a very narrow margin, as results showed him leading Barr by about 600 votes. The results were re-canvassed due to the closeness of the outcome, but Chandler was certified as the election winner on November 12, 2010.

In October 2011, Barr called their forthcoming contest "a rematch of the third-closest Congressional race in America" and said that Chandler was burdened with "considerable dissatisfaction" on the part of his constituents and the difficulty of running on the ticket with Obama. But Joshua Miller of Roll Call observed that "if the bent of the GOP-leaning district grows more Democratic and Democrats who sat out 2010 come to the polls next November, Barr has a steep hill to climb."

2012

Chandler was again challenged by Barr. Randolph S. Vance ran as a write-in candidate. Barr defeated Chandler in the election, 50.6% to 46.7%.

Post-congressional career
Chandler did not run for Governor in 2015, though he has hinted that he might run for office again in the future.

From 2013 to 2016, Chandler served as Executive Director of the Kentucky Humanities Council. Since 2016, he has been the CEO of the Foundation for a Healthy Kentucky. He is a member of the ReFormers Caucus of Issue One.

See also
Politics of Kentucky

References

External links

 

|-

|-

|-

1959 births
American Presbyterians
American prosecutors
Democratic Party members of the United States House of Representatives from Kentucky
Kentucky Attorneys General
Living people
People from Versailles, Kentucky
State Auditors of Kentucky
University of Kentucky College of Law alumni
21st-century American politicians